Zinc protoporphyrin (ZPP) refers to coordination complexes of zinc and protoporphyrin IX.  It is a red-purple solid that is soluble in water. The complex and related species are found in red blood cells when heme production is inhibited by lead and/or by lack of iron.

Clinical utility
Measurement of zinc protoporphyrin in red cells has been used for screening for lead poisoning.
and for iron deficiency.

Zinc protoporphyrin levels can be elevated as the result of a number of conditions, for instance:
lead poisoning
iron deficiency
sickle cell anemia
sideroblastic anemia
anemia of chronic disease
vanadium exposure
erythropoietic protoporphyria
Diverse types of cancer
The virtue of elevated ZPP testing as a screen is that all of these conditions can be considered worth discovering.

The fluorescent properties of ZPP in intact red cells allows the ZPP/heme molar ratio to be measured quickly, at low cost, and in a small sample volume.

ZnPP is finding a new use as a drug in combined cancer therapies.

History
Porphyrin complexes of zinc have been known since the 1930s. In 1974 ZPP was identified as a major non-heme porphyrin formed in red cells as the result of lead poisoning or iron deficiency.,

It was already known at this time that non-heme protoporphyrin IX levels were elevated in these conditions, but prior investigators had used acidic extraction methods in their assays that converted ZPP to unbound Protoporphyrin IX.

The early literature is sometimes confusing, and results are hard to compare without detailed examination of the measurement methods and the conversion factors used to report the results. Reports may refer to free erythrocyte protoporphyrin (FEP) or erythrocyte protoporphyrin (EP or EPP). ZPP is also abbreviated ZP and ZnPP. Current practice is tending to measure and report the molar ratio of ZPP to heme (μmole/mole).

For cancer therapy

ZnPP has been investigated for cancer therapies.

ZnPP is a competitive inhibitor of heme oxygenase. Heme oxygenase is a cytoprotective enzyme that copes with oxidative stress on a cell and shows higher expression in cancerous tissues. ZnPP suppression of heme oxygenase reduces cell viability of cancer cells and increases cytotoxicity in cancer cells. ZnPP works in combination with anticancer drugs to increase cytotoxicity. ZnPP inhibits tumor growth especially solid tumors. Tumors from brain cancer, colon cancer, prostate cancer, renal cell cancer, oral squamous cell cancer, and leukemia all show a susceptibility to ZnPP due to increase expression of heme oxygenase. The inhibition of heme oxygenase leads to an increase of reactive oxidative species in the cell which sensitizes the cells to chemotherapeutic agents. Increased reactive oxidative species can cause apoptosis in cancer cells and reduce drug resistance when exposed to ZnPP due to loss of the heme oxygenase coping mechanism. The combination of these two therapies is highly effective in treating cancer in experiments thus far, and is a possible new method for overcoming drug resistance. The reduced coping ability of tissues treated with ZnPP also increases radiosensitivity. Cells treated with ZnPP and radiation as opposed to simply one of the two are less viable and more likely to stay in G1 phase of the cell cycle, rather than progress to the G2 phase. ZnPP and radiation combination therapy shows more apoptosis than the same amount of radiation displaying that ZnPP puts stress on cancerous tissue. ZnPP have been injected in a number of trials on solid tumors, but can be utilized more broadly when effectively delivered to cancer cells and not healthy cells. A targeted delivery system is needed to fully exploit the uses of ZnPP as a therapeutic agent and heme oxygenase inhibitor due to the potential side effects of free ZnPP on healthy tissue.  Reducing the anti-oxidant capability of healthy cells can reduce effects that would have been favorable. However ZnPP have been encapsulated in nanoparticles with specialized coating for drug delivery inside the body. ZnPP did not show any reduce inhibitory potential on heme oxygenase when loaded into nanoparticles. Similarly ZnPP loaded into nanoparticles has a higher cytotoxicity than free ZnPP after two days due to a more favorable release rate as well as better biodistribution and internalization. The possible negative effects on major organs were not seen and blood distribution is more desirable in ZnPP loaded nanoparticles than free ZnPP. The specific inhibition of heme oxygenase using nanoparticles with encapsulated ZnPP reduces side effects and is likely the future method of administering ZnPP treatment.

Structural chemistry
Zinc porphyrins are always five- or six-coordinate. Because the axial ligands are labile, these complexes are often depicted with planar structures.  Planar zinc(II) complexes are unknown.

References

Porphyrins
Blood cells